The Cathedral of Saint Andrew is a Catholic cathedral located in Grand Rapids, Michigan, United States.  It is the seat of the Diocese of Grand Rapids.

History
St. Andrew's history traces its beginning to the founding of St. Mary's Church by the Rev. Frederic Baraga.  He built a small church, rectory and school on the west bank of the Grand River and  the people who attended the church were Native Americans.  The Rev. Andreas Viszoczky was named the parish's first pastor two years later.    After the Native Americans left and the town of Grand Rapids grew, Father Viszoczky built a new church on Monroe Street which he named St. Andrew.  The church building was constructed of Grand River limestone and completed in 1850.

Grand Rapids continued to grow as did the parish and a new church was soon needed.  In 1875, the present church was started on Sheldon Boulevard and completed a year later.  On May 19, 1882 Pope Leo XIII established the Diocese of Grand Rapids.  The diocese's first bishop Henry J. Richter chose Saint Andrew's as his cathedral and was consecrated in it on April 22, 1883.

Lightning struck the cathedral in 1901 and a fire destroyed part of the church building.  It was rebuilt and expanded.    Some of the wooden beams above the ceiling still show the charred marks from the fire.  A television studio was created in the cathedral in the 1950s to televise a weekly Sunday Mass.  The cameras have been updated in the 21st century to provide for digital broadcasts.  Another expansion of the cathedral facilities occurred from 1961 to 1963.  The St. Ambrose Chapel wing was added at that time and Maple Street from Sheldon to Division was closed and a green space created.

A major renovation of the cathedral in 1979-1980 brought the altar forward into the congregation and a vesting and gathering area was created.  Another major renovation from 1997 to 2000 created a baptismal pool and refurbished the stained glass windows and the Stations of the Cross.  The current pipe organ was installed in 2002.  The front entrance of the cathedral was remodeled in 2009 and the Piazza Secchia was laid.  It is patterned after the piazza created by Michelangelo on the Capitoline Hill in Rome.

See also
List of churches in the Roman Catholic Diocese of Grand Rapids
List of Catholic cathedrals in the United States
List of cathedrals in the United States

References

External links

Official Cathedral Site
Diocese of Grand Rapids Official Site 

Churches in the Roman Catholic Diocese of Grand Rapids
Religious organizations established in 1833
1833 establishments in Michigan Territory
Roman Catholic churches completed in 1876
Andrew Grand Rapids
Churches in Grand Rapids, Michigan
Gothic Revival church buildings in Michigan
19th-century Roman Catholic church buildings in the United States